Bernold Fiedler (born 15 May 1956) is a German mathematician, specializing in nonlinear dynamics.

Fiedler received a Diploma from Heidelberg University in 1980 for his thesis Ein Räuber-Beute-System mit zwei time lags ("A predator-prey system with two time lags") and his doctorate with his thesis Stabilitätswechsel und globale Hopf-Verzweigung (Stability transformation and global Hopf bifurcation), written under the direction of Willi Jäger. Fiedler is a professor at the Institute for Mathematics of the Free University of Berlin.

His research includes, among other topics, global bifurcation, global attractors, and patterning in reaction-diffusion equations (an area of research pioneered by  Alan Turing).

In 2008, Fiedler gave the Gauss Lecture with a talk titled "Aus Nichts wird nichts? Mathematik der Selbstorganisation".  In 2002 he was, with Stefan Liebscher, an Invited Speaker at the ICM in Beijing, with a talk titled "Bifurcations without parameters: some ODE and PDE examples".

Selected publications

Articles
with S. B. Angenent: The dynamics of rotating waves in scalar reaction diffusion equations, Trans. Amer. Math. Soc. 307 (1988), 545–568 
with Peter Poláčik: "Complicated dynamics of scalar reaction diffusion equations with a nonlocal term." Proceedings of the Royal Society of Edinburgh Section A: Mathematics 115, no. 1–2 (1990): 167–192. 
with Shui-Nee Chow and Bo Deng: "Homoclinic bifurcation at resonant eigenvalues." Journal of Dynamics and Differential Equations 2, no. 2 (1990): 177–244. 
with Carlos Rocha: Orbit equivalence of global attractors of semilinear parabolic differential equations, Trans. Amer. Math. Soc. 352 (2000), 257–284 
Spatio-Temporal Dynamics of Reaction-Diffusion Patterns, in M. Kirkilionis, S. Krömker, R. Rannacher, F. Tomi (eds.) Trends in Nonlinear Analysis, Festschrift dedicated to Willi Jäger for his 60th birthday, Springer-Verlag, 2003, pp. 23–152. 
Romeo und Julia, spontane Musterbildung und Turings Instabilität, in Martin Aigner, Ehrhard Behrends (eds.) Alles Mathematik. Von Pythagoras zum CD Player, Vieweg, 3rd edition 2009

Books

References

20th-century German mathematicians
21st-century German mathematicians
Heidelberg University alumni
Free University of Berlin
1956 births
Living people